Mike Not (a.k.a. Mika Paju) is a creator of techno music from Tampere, Finland, though he has also produced industrial music (influenced by Skinny Puppy, Front Line Assembly, Nine Inch Nails, Marilyn Manson et al.), hip-hop, breakbeat, acid house, experimental music and so on. Mike Not has created music and worked as a DJ from 1987. Mike Not borrowed his alias from Spanish DJ Mike Platinas, performing initially as Mike "Not" Platinas, but eventually the name was shortened to Mike Not. Mike Not is mainly known for his Noise Production project, but Mike has also worked as a sound engineer and producer for many other acts, such as Finnish hip-hop acts Petri Nygård and Nuera, Tampere's gothic rock band Suruaika and some others. Mike Not is also a member of Tampere's electro music act Kompleksi.

External links 
Noise Production
Noise Production @ MySpace

Living people
Finnish electronic musicians
Year of birth missing (living people)